Sudhira Sundari Devi Narayan of Cooch Bihar, also known as Princess Mander, was an Indian princess of the princely state of Cooch Behar, British India. She was born in Calcutta on 7 March 1894, the youngest daughter of H.H. Sri Sri Maharaja Sir Nripendra Narayan Bhup Bahadur, Maharaja of Cooch Behar, by his wife H.H. Maharani Sunity Devee Sahiba, sometime Regent of Cooch-Behar and President of the State Council. She married at Woodlands, Calcutta, on 25 February 1914 Alan Mander, brother of Miles and Geoffrey Mander of Wightwick Manor, by whom she had two sons and two daughters. She died at 40 Hereford Rd, London, on 7 January 1968, when her will was proved in London on 15 February 1968 at £91.

See also
Mander family
Sunity Devee (1921), The Autobiography of an Indian Princess, London: J. Murray, on the Internet Archive

References

1968 deaths
1894 births
Indian princesses
Indian socialites 
People from Cooch Behar
19th-century Indian women
20th-century Indian women